Uelsen is a Samtgemeinde ("collective municipality") in the district of Bentheim, in Lower Saxony, Germany. Its seat is in the municipality Uelsen.

The Samtgemeinde Uelsen consists of the following municipalities:

 Getelo 
 Gölenkamp 
 Halle 
 Itterbeck 
 Uelsen
 Wielen 
 Wilsum

Samtgemeinden in Lower Saxony